The Révay family was a Hungarian noble family, who owned estates in Turóc county, the Kingdom of Hungary (Turiec region in today's Slovakia) until the early 20th century. Their property included i.a. the Rococo-classical manor house in Mošovce, the so-called Old Manor house demolished in the middle of the 20th century, the Noblemen's Mansion and the park in Mošovce, a castle in Blatnica, lands and a castle in Sklabiňa, as well as a manor-house with a park in Turčianska Štiavnička.

Family history

The Révay family has been known since the 13th century. The first known ancestor of the family was called Comes Jakab (Count Jakab) in the early 13th century. The main estates of the family were situated in the region of Syrmia until the Ottoman occupation of southern Hungary. In 1556 and 1635 the family was promoted to Barons and on 17 June 1723 to Counts. The coat of arms of the Masters de Reva, which can be seen at the façade of their manor house, is composed of a wolf Tenné growing from a crown of Or, holding three roses. Mošovce became the property of the Révay family in 1534, six years after the donation of the King of Hungary, Ferdinand I, Holy Roman Emperor. The last member of the family, who resided in Mošovce, was count Ferenc Révay. Today the descendants of the family live in Trnava, Bratislava, Graz as well as in Hungary. The last letter of the name is sometimes "i" instead of "y" in some printed versions or as an affair of modernization in the late 19th century Kingdom of Hungary.

After World War II, the property of the Révay family in Turiec was nationalized. In 1993, the niece of Ladislav Révay, the last of the counts, filed a request for the restitution of their property. The request ended up in court as the Révay family and the state had differing opinions as to the extent of their claim. In 2001 the restitution claim of the Révays was rejected by the Constitutional Court of the Slovak Republic. 5 years later, however, the European Court of Human Rights in Strasbourg issued a ruling allowing the matter to proceed, thus opening a possibility for a reconciliation of both parties.

In Sweden, the family is considered part of the unintroduced nobility.

See also
 Peter Révay
 Church of Holy Trinity in Mošovce

Gallery

See also
List of titled noble families in the Kingdom of Hungary

References

External links
Short bio of János Mór Révai (Révay) the chief editor of Révai's Big Lexicon

Further reading
BEŇOVSKÝ, J. a kol.: Mošovce v premenách času. Martin: Osveta, 1984. 304 pp.
LIPPAN, M. a kol.: Mošovce. Banská Bystrica: Stredoslovenské vydavateľstvo, 1971. 405 pp.
REŤKOVSKÝ, P.: The Tourist Guide of Sites in Mošovce. Mošovce: Obecný úrad Mošovce, 2004. 38 pp., 
TATÁR, J.: Mošovce v historickej, kultúrnej a prírodnej mozaike. Mošovce: Obecný úrad Mošovce, 2003. 124 pp., 
TATÁR, J.: Živý poklad (Povesti z Mošoviec). Mošovce: Obecný úrad Mošovce, 1994. 64 pp. 

 
Hungarian nobility
Swedish unintroduced nobility
Mošovce